Storetveit Church is a parish church of the Church of Norway in Bergen Municipality in Vestland county, Norway. It is located in the Fjøsanger neighborhood in Årstad borough in the city of Bergen. It is the church for the Storetveit parish which is part of the Bergensdalen prosti (deanery) in the Diocese of Bjørgvin. The large, stone church was built in a long church design in 1930 using plans drawn up by the architect Ole Landmark. The church seats about 600 people.

History
During the 1920s, plans were made to build another church in the large Årstad Church parish. Originally, the church was going to be built at Minde, but the plot of land ended up being unsuitable for the church, so a new plot of land at Storetveit was chosen. An architectural competition was held to find the person to design the new church. Ole Landmark won the competition for his designs of a church built in natural stone with Gothic details. Construction on the new church took place from 1928 to 1930. The church has a large rectangular nave with an octagonal choir. A small tower with a spire sits above the choir. There was a sacristy built to the north of the nave and a chapel on the south side of the nave. The new building was consecrated on 30 November 1930.

Media gallery

See also
List of churches in Bjørgvin

References

Churches in Bergen
Long churches in Norway
Stone churches in Norway
20th-century Church of Norway church buildings
Churches completed in 1930
1930 establishments in Norway